Jens Schoor (born 27 April 1987 in Koblenz) is a professional squash player who represents Germany. He reached a career-high world ranking of no. 60 in March 2015.

References

External links 
 
 
 

German male squash players
Living people
1987 births
Competitors at the 2009 World Games
Sportspeople from Koblenz